Lone Tree is a community in eastern Okmulgee County, Oklahoma, United States, approximately seven and one-half miles from Morris, traveling east on U.S. Route 62, then south on N4080 Rd.  It was named for a "lone tree" sitting on the skyline of a mountain. Lone Tree Church is also located in this area near the so-called High Spring Mountains.

Lone Tree is the birthplace of Anita Hill, notable for accusing Supreme Court Justice Clarence Thomas of sexual harassment during his confirmation hearings in 1991.

References

Unincorporated communities in Oklahoma
Geography of Okmulgee County, Oklahoma